Gholamhossein Mohammadi Golpayegani (also known as " Mohammadi Golpayegani",; born ) is an Iranian Shia Islamic cleric who is the Chief of Staff of the Office of the Supreme Leader of Iran (presently Ali Khamenei), and do its related affairs. Mohammadi Golpayegani who is also famous as "Hujjatul Islam Golpayegani" was born in 1943 (1322 S.H.) in the city of Golpayegan, in Isfahan Province.

His father, Abul Qasim Mohammadi Golpayegani was well-known as an Islamic scholar/commentator and likewise the Imam of Friday prayer in Golpayegan. He was among the political warriors against Pahlavi, and also among the audience in the event of attack to Feyziyeh School. Gholamhosein  Mohammadi Golpayegani is a poet, too, and there have been published his poems in the press of Iran. "Persian Gulf" is regarded among his prominent poems that describes it according to his words."

See also 

 Office of the Supreme Leader of Iran
 Supreme leader of Iran
 Ali Khamenei

References

External links

1943 births
Living people
Iranian ayatollahs
Iranian individuals subject to the U.S. Department of the Treasury sanctions
Ali Khamenei